Sadowiec-Wrzosy  is a village in the administrative district of Gmina Działoszyn, within Pajęczno County, Łódź Voivodeship, in central Poland.

The village has a population of 170.

References

Sadowiec-Wrzosy